Cessalto is a comune in the province of Treviso, Veneto, northern Italy. It is home to a  Palladian Villa, the Villa Zeno.

References

Cities and towns in Veneto